Chorrillos is a district of the Lima Province in Peru and part of the city of Lima. It gets its name from the Spanish word for "trickle of water". The district was founded as San Pedro de los Chorrillos and served as a deluxe beach resort until the late 19th century, when it was almost completely destroyed by Chilean forces during the War of the Pacific.

The current mayor of Chorrilos is Augusto Miyashiro Ushikobo.

Geography
The district has a total land area of 38.94 km². Its administrative center is located 37 meters above sea level.
Morro Solar is situated in Chorrillos District.

Boundaries
 North: Barranco and Santiago de Surco
 East: Santiago de Surco
 South and west: Pacific Ocean

Demographics
According to the 2005 census by the INEI, the district has 262,595 inhabitants, a population density of 6,743.6 persons/km² and 60,353 households.

Attractions
It is famous for its beach resorts at La Herradura, its restaurants, particularly the picanterías (specialising in spicy dishes).

A planetarium (planetario) is located here, built on the Morro Solar. From Chorrillos, you can also enjoy a panoramic view of the bay of Lima and out to La Punta (Spanish for point, headland)  and the San Lorenzo Island in Callao.

History
The area around the Morro Solar was once a pre-Columbian town known as Armatambo. Following the Spanish conquest of Peru, however, the hillside settlement was abandoned (few fragments exist today, most in bad condition, some endangered to disappear) and forgotten, as the Indians began to move down to shore. The resulting town of San Pedro de los Chorrillos was officially established as the District of Chorrillos on January 2, 1857.

The district's territory was the setting of important episodes in the War of the Pacific against Chile (1879–1883). There is a nameplate inside the Fire Station that remembers the names of the Italian firemen who were executed by a Chilean firing squad for attempting to put out the fires and save the civilian population. From republican times, only a select group of the large old houses have survived, as the majority were destroyed by Chilean invaders.

The Chorrillos Military School was opened here in 1898.

Notable people from Chorrillos

 Juan Jose Cabezudo (died 1860) - chef
 Famous Peru national football team midfielder Roberto Palacios grew up in Chorrillos, and that is why he is nicknamed El Chorrillano.
 The Taekwondo Pan American Champion of Peru, Jean Carlos Gamarra grew up in Chorrillos and founded a Community Taekwondo Program for the impoverished children of "Delicias," a poor neighborhood of the district. His community program has gained the attention of Mayor Augusto Miyashiro and the Federación Deportiva Peruana de Taekwondo in the past.
 The Afro-Peruvian singer Susana Baca is from Chorrillos.
 The fisherman José Olaya (José Silverio Olaya Balandra), (1782 - †1823), martyr during the struggle for independence and national hero, was born in Chorrillos.
 The former Minister of Education Ramón Miranda Ampuero was born there.

Festivities 
 June: Saint Peter
 October: Lord of Miracles

References

External links
Municipalidad de Chorrillos
Chorrillos.pe - Information about Chorrillos

Districts of Lima
1857 establishments in Peru